This is a complete list of ice hockey players who were drafted in the National Hockey League Entry Draft by the St. Louis Blues franchise. It includes every player who was drafted, regardless of whether they played for the team.

Key
 Played at least one game with the Blues
 Spent entire NHL career with the Blues
() Inducted into the Hockey Hall of Fame
() Number retired by the Blues

Draft picks
Statistics are complete as of the 2019–20 NHL season and show each player's career regular season totals in the NHL.  Wins, losses, ties, overtime losses and goals against average apply to goaltenders and are used only for players at that position.

See also
1967 NHL Expansion Draft

References
General
 
 
 
Specific

 
draft picks
St. Louis Blues